Hallie Elizabeth Ephron (born March 9, 1948) is an American novelist, book reviewer, journalist, and writing teacher. She is the author of mystery and suspense  novels. Her novels Never Tell a Lie, There Was an Old Woman, Come and Find Me, and Night Night, Sleep Tight were finalists for the Mary Higgins Clark Award. In 2011, Never Tell a Lie was made into a Lifetime television movie entitled And Baby Will Fall, starring Anastasia Griffith, Brendan Fehr, and Clea DuVall.

You'll Never Know, Dear was published in June 2017 by William Morrow and Company. Her how-to book, Writing and Selling Your Mystery Novel, was nominated for a 2006 Edgar Award with an updated edition released in 2017. She is also the award-winning crime fiction book reviewer for the Boston Globe and teaches fiction writing at writing conferences. For twelve years Ephron reviewed crime fiction for the Boston Globe.

Personal life 
Hallie Ephron was born in Los Angeles, California, to parents Henry and Phoebe Ephron, both East Coast-born-and-raised screenwriters. She is the sister of Nora Ephron, Delia Ephron, and Amy Ephron. She graduated from Barnard College in 1969. She was married for 52 years to Jerold Touger, who died on August 6, 2021. They have two daughters. Her family is Jewish.

Published works

Suspense novels 
Never Tell a Lie (2009)
Come and Find Me (2011)
There Was an Old Woman (2012)
Night Night, Sleep Tight (2014)
You'll Never Know, Dear (2017)
Careful What You Wish For (2019)

Nonfiction 
Writing and Selling Your Mystery Novel: Revised and Expanded (2017)
Writing and Selling Your Mystery Novel: How to Knock 'em Dead with Style (2005)
1001 Books for Every Mood (2008)
The Bibliophile's Devotional (2009)

Dr. Peter Zak mystery series 
Written by Hallie Ephron and Donald Davidoff under the name "G. H. Ephron"
Amnesia (2000)
Addiction (2001)
Delusion (2002)
Obsessed (2003)
Guilt (2004)

References 
 Milton Times, August 23, 2021

External links 

1948 births
Living people
20th-century American novelists
21st-century American novelists
People from Los Angeles
American mystery writers
American women journalists
Jewish American novelists
American women novelists
20th-century American women writers
21st-century American women writers
Barnard College alumni
Women mystery writers
Journalists from California
Novelists from California
Ephron family
20th-century American non-fiction writers
21st-century American non-fiction writers
21st-century American Jews